The 2013 season was FC Kansas City's first season of existence, in which they competed in the National Women's Soccer League, the top division of women's soccer in the United States.

Club

Roster 
As of April 13, 2013.

Team management 
FC Kansas City's ownership group is composed of Chris, Brad and Greg Likens, and Brian Budzinski. The group also owns the Missouri Comets of the Major Indoor Soccer League. Budzinski is also owner of the Kansas City Soccerdome. Vlatko Andonovski, a former professional player and head coach of the Kansas City Kings of the PASL and Missouri Olympic Development Program (ODP), was head coach for the 2013 season.

Competitions

Results summary

Match results

Preseason

NWSL

Regular season 
Kickoff times are in CDT (UTC-05)

Standings

Team statistics

Honors and awards 
 Lauren Holiday – NWSL Player of the Month, June 2013 
 Erika Tymrak – NWSL Player of the Week, week 15 
 Erika Tymrak – NWSL Player of the Month, July 2013

NWSL Championship Playoffs

References 

FC Kansas City seasons
FC Kansas City
FC Kansas City
FC Kansas City